Cladiscitidae is an extinct family of cephalopods in the ammonoid order Ceratitida. These nektonic carnivores  lived during the Triassic.

Distribution
Fossils of species within this family have been found in the Triassic of Afghanistan, Albania, Canada, China, Greece, Hungary, Iran, Italy, Oman, Russia, Slovenia, Turkey, and the United States.

References

Triassic ammonites